Swimming has been contested at every Summer Paralympics. At the first games, the 1960 Paralympics, 62 swimming events were held in distances of 25 and 50 metres, plus a 3×50 metre relay for men. Since then, swimming at the Paralympics has grown to 140 events covering distances from 50 to 400 metres, plus 4×50 and 4×100 metre relays. Along with track and field athletics, it is one of the largest sports at the Paralympics in terms of the number of events, competitors, and spectators.

As with most Paralympic sports, athletes are classified according to the type and extent of their disability.

The International Paralympic Committee recognizes the fastest times swum at the games as Paralympic records.

Summary

Medal table 
Updated to 2020 Summer Paralympics. Countries in italics are former countries who participated in the Paralympic Games.

Multiple Paralympic swimming medalists 
This table is updated to the 2016 Paralympics.

Nations

See also
Swimming at the Summer Olympics
World Para Swimming Championships

References 

 

 
Paralympics
Sports at the Summer Paralympics